The Mistake may refer to:

"The Mistake" (House), a 2005 episode of the television series House
The Mistake (film), a 1913 silent film
The Mistake, a play by Sir John Vanbrugh
The Mistakes, a 1690 English tragicomedy by Joseph Harris

See also
Mistake (disambiguation)
Mistaken (disambiguation)